John Mullahy is an Australian politician. He is a member of Australian Labor Party (Victorian Branch) and the current member for the division of Glen Waverley of the Victorian Legislative Assembly, having been elected to the seat in the 2022 state election.

References

Year of birth missing (living people)
Living people
Australian Labor Party members of the Parliament of Victoria
Members of the Victorian Legislative Assembly
21st-century Australian politicians
Labor Left politicians